The Nassau County Sports Hall of Fame honors elite athletes and sports media workers who have roots in Nassau County, New York. The Hall of Fame presentation takes places at the Nassau County Sports Commission "Salute to Champions" Awards Dinner annually every April.

Inductees

See also
Nassau County Sports Commission
John Mackey Award
Dick Schaap Award for Outstanding Journalism

External links
 

Halls of fame in New York (state)
All-sports halls of fame
Sports museums in New York (state)
Sports in Long Island
Museums in Nassau County, New York